The women's 100 metre backstroke was a swimming event held as part of the swimming at the 1936 Summer Olympics programme. It was the fourth appearance of the event, which was established in 1924. The competition was held from Tuersday to Thursday, 11 to 13 August 1936.

Twenty-one swimmers from 14 nations competed.

Medalists

Records
These were the standing world and Olympic records (in minutes) prior to the 1936 Summer Olympics.

Nida Senff set a new Olympic record in the first heat with 1:16.2 minutes.

Results

Heats

Thursday 11 August 1936: The fastest four in each heat advanced to the semi-finals.

Heat 1

Heat 2

Heat 3

Semifinals

Wednesday 12 August 1936: The fastest three in each semi-final and the fastest fourth-placed advanced to the final.

Semifinal 1

Semifinal 2

Final

Thursday 13 August 1936:

References

External links
Olympic Report
 

Swimming at the 1936 Summer Olympics
1936 in women's swimming
SWim